McCormick station, also known as the Charleston & Western Carolina Railway Depot, is a historic train station located at McCormick in McCormick County, South Carolina.  It was built about 1911 by the Charleston and Western Carolina Railway.  It is a one-story, rectangular frame building with a gable roof, wide eaves supported by brackets, and shiplap siding.

It was listed on the National Register of Historic Places in 1985.

References

Railway stations on the National Register of Historic Places in South Carolina
Railway stations in the United States opened in 1911
National Register of Historic Places in McCormick County, South Carolina
Former Atlantic Coast Line Railroad stations
Former railway stations in South Carolina